The 2020 IKF European Korfball Championship First Round was held in Lviv, Ukraine from 1 to 3 November 2019. The tournament served as the first round of the 2020 IKF European Korfball Championships to be held in the Poland in 2020, with both the winner and runner-up qualifying for the 2020 IKF European Korfball B-Championship. Turkey and Switzerland qualified on 3 November 2019 as they won their semi-final matches against Greece and Ukraine respectively. Later that same day, Turkey beat Switzerland to win the tournament.

Participating teams
Seven teams participated in the tournament: Armenia, Belarus, Greece, Sweden, Switzerland, Turkey and Ukraine.

Group stage
Two groups (A and B) were drawn, four teams in group A and three teams in group B, with each team playing the other teams in their group once. The top two teams in these groups moved to the semi-finals, while the remaining three teams played another round-robin tournament to determine theor final overall position.

All group stage matches were played at the Palats sportu “Halychyna” in Lviv on 1 and 2 November 2019.

Group A

|}

Group B

|}

Semi-finals

5th–7th place play-offs
The teams finishing third & fourth in both groups played another round-robin group stage to determine fifth through seventh place.

|}

Final standing

External links
Tournament Results

European Korfball Championship
2019 in korfball
2019 in Ukrainian sport
International sports competitions hosted by Ukraine
Korfball in Ukraine
Sport in Lviv
November 2019 sports events in Ukraine